is a Japanese former handball player who competed in the 1984 Summer Olympics.

References

1961 births
Living people
Japanese male handball players
Olympic handball players of Japan
Handball players at the 1984 Summer Olympics
20th-century Japanese people